Hajjilar or Haji Lar may refer to:
 Mrgastan, Armenia
 Hajjilar, East Azerbaijan, a village in East Azerbaijan Province, Iran
 Hajjilar, West Azerbaijan, a village in West Azerbaijan Province, Iran
 Hajjilar District, in West Azerbaijan Province, Iran
 Hajjilar Rural District, in West Azerbaijan Province, Iran
 Hajjilar-e Jonubi Rural District, in West Azerbaijan Province, Iran
 Hajjilar-e Shomali Rural District, in West Azerbaijan Province, Iran